Baby Einstein is a series of videos designed for infants. Founded by Julie Aigner-Clark in 1996 in her Atlanta home, Clark couldn't find a video to share with her first-born child, Aspen Clark. After successful sales in the first five years, Clark sold the company to The Walt Disney Company in 2001. After eleven years of producing videos, Disney sold the company to Kids II, Inc. in 2013. The franchise has since been rebranded under Kids II, which primarily focuses on toys and other infant products.

Pre-Disney videos
All pre-Disney videos were directed by Julie Aigner-Clark. Following the purchase of the company by Disney, each of the videos were re-released sometime in 2004, with some alterations.

Disney videos
Sometime in 2004, most of the videos were re-released, with some alterations. Additional rereleases of the videos came out in 2008 and 2010.

Discovery Kit Videos
In 2010, a series of Baby Einstein box sets called Discovery Kits were made with Julie Aigner-Clark as the director. Later in 2012, they were released as original videos.

References

Multimedia works
Baby Einstein